Rodman Emmason Logan (September 7, 1922 – September 15, 2004) was a Canadian politician. He served in the Legislative Assembly of New Brunswick from 1963 to 1982 as member of the Progressive Conservative party from the constituency of Saint John County from 1963 to 1967 and Saint John West from 1967 to 1982.

References

1922 births
2004 deaths
Politicians from Saint John, New Brunswick
Progressive Conservative Party of New Brunswick MLAs